Julia King (born 8 December 1992) is a New Zealand field hockey player. She has competed for the New Zealand women's national field hockey team (the Black Sticks Women) since 2011. She was a travelling reserve player for the team during the 2012 Summer Olympics. She participated at the 2020 Women's FIH Pro League.

Life
Born in Auckland, King attended St Cuthbert's College.

References

External links
 

1992 births
Living people
New Zealand female field hockey players
People educated at St Cuthbert's College, Auckland
Female field hockey forwards
Female field hockey midfielders
Field hockey players at the 2020 Summer Olympics
Olympic field hockey players of New Zealand
20th-century New Zealand women
21st-century New Zealand women